Sport Clube Marítimo, better known as Marítimo Graciosa is a Portuguese sports club from Santa Cruz da Graciosa, Azores.

The men's football team plays in the district league. The team enjoyed spells in the Terceira Divisão in 2005 to 2007 and 2012–13. The team also contested the Taça de Portugal during these years.

References

Football clubs in Portugal
Association football clubs established in 1957
1957 establishments in Portugal
Football clubs in the Azores